Muslyumovo is the name of several rural localities in Russia:
Muslyumovo, Chelyabinsk Oblast, a selo in Chelyabinsk Oblast
Muslyumovo, Aznakayevsky District, Republic of Tatarstan, a village in Aznakayevsky District of the Republic of Tatarstan
Muslyumovo, Muslyumovsky District, Republic of Tatarstan, a selo in Muslyumovsky District of the Republic of Tatarstan

See also
zheleznodorozhnaya stantsiya Muslyumovo, a settlement in Chelyabinsk Oblast